WENO is an AM radio station operating in the Nashville, Tennessee market on the frequency of 760 kHz. It is currently programmed with a Gospel music and Ministry format and has a power of 1,000 watts; operation is limited to daytime hours to prevent interference to WJR, Detroit, Michigan.

History on 1430 kHz
The historic WENO broadcast on the frequency of 1430 kHz currently assigned to WYGI. It was the only Nashville-area station in the early post-World War II era to program country music as its major format; even WSM, known in the public mind as the most influential station in the genre's development, from its inception until the 1970s limited its broadcast of country music to the nighttime hours, when the clear-channel signal penetrated deeply throughout the country. After the 1950s when network programming largely migrated to television, the bulk of WSM's programming actually consisted of popular (middle-of-the-road, later adult contemporary) music, judged by its owners to be more "mainstream" and, hence, more attractive to a large segment of listeners, particularly those younger and affluent people most attractive to advertisers. WSM did not adopt country full-time (except for a morning drive-time show) until about 1979.

The unwillingness of most broadcasters in the Nashville market to allow country music prominent airplay meant that WENO, by default, became very influential in the country music industry in the 1950s and 1960s, especially for what was then a 5,000-watt station. As the main country music station in what had become the recording capital of the genre, it provided recording executives with immediate input as to what country audiences, at least those in the Nashville area, desired; in effect, it acted as a test market for country records. Disc jockey Bob Jennings, a one-time WLAC employee, was probably the most influential on-air personality at the station during this period.

WENO was licensed to the Nashville suburb of Madison, Tennessee, then on the edge of a rural area; the station's five-acre (two-hectare) campus was promoted to listeners on air as the "WENO Radio Ranch". WENO began to decline as other, more-powerful stations switched to a country format, and as AM listeners in general, especially among the young, affluent consumers coveted by advertisers, switched increasingly to FM stations. By the 1980s, the station had gone silent; the callsign was used for a period by a gospel music station in Chattahoochee, Florida prior to being returned to Nashville for its current usage.

See also
List of Nashville media

External links

ENO
ENO